The 1957 Alabama Crimson Tide football team (variously "Alabama", "UA" or "Bama") represented the University of Alabama in the 1957 NCAA University Division football season. It was the Crimson Tide's 63rd overall and 24th season as a member of the Southeastern Conference (SEC). The team was led by head coach Jennings B. Whitworth, in his third year, and played their home games at Denny Stadium in Tuscaloosa, Legion Field in Birmingham and at Ladd Stadium in Mobile, Alabama. They finished with a record of two wins, seven losses and one tie (2–7–1 overall, 1–6–1 in the SEC).

Alabama opened the season by going winless over their first five games. After a loss at LSU, the Crimson Tide played Vanderbilt to a tie at Nashville. They then lost to TCU, Tennessee and Mississippi State before they won their first game at Georgia. The Crimson Tide then lost consecutive home games to Tulane and Georgia Tech before they won their second game of the season against . Alabama then closed the season with a 40–0 loss in the Iron Bowl against eventual national champion Auburn.

On October 24, University officials announced the contract of head coach Whitworth would not be renewed when it expired December 1 at the conclusion of the season. On December 3, former Maryland, Kentucky and then Texas A&M head coach and former Alabama player Bear Bryant was hired as both the head coach of the football team and athletic director at Alabama.

Schedule

Game summaries

LSU

Source:

To open the 1957 season, Alabama was shutout by LSU 28–0 at Tiger Stadium in Baton Rouge. LSU took the opening kickoff and drove 67-yards for a one-yard Jim Taylor touchdown run that gave the Tigers a 7–0 lead at halftime after a scoreless second quarter. In the third quarter, Win Turner intercepted an Alabama pass that gave LSU possession at their 40-yard line. Six plays later, Turner then threw a 42-yard touchdown pass to J. W. Brodnax for a 14–0 lead. Billy Cannon then scored the final two Tigers' touchdowns for the 28–0 victory. The first came on a 53-yard run in the third quarter and the second on a 73-yard run in the fourth quarter that followed a fake punt. The loss brought Alabama's all-time record against LSU to 15–7–4.

Vanderbilt

Sources:

In their second consecutive road game to open the 1957 season, the Crimson Tide played the Vanderbilt Commodores to a 6–6 tie at Dudley Field. Alabama took an early 6–0 lead on a short James Loftin touchdown run that capped their first offensive possession. The Commodores then tied the game 6–6 in the second quarter on a four-yard William Smith touchdown run. The Crimson Tide nearly pulled off the upset late in the fourth quarter after a 58-yard Jerry Daniel punt return gave Alabama possession at the Vandy eight-yard line. However, Alabama was unable to score as time expired just prior to a fourth down play from inside the five-yard line. The tie brought Alabama's all-time record against Vanderbilt to 18–16–2.

TCU

Sources:

For the third consecutive season, Alabama played the Texas Christian University (TCU) Horned Frogs of the Southwest Conference, and for the third time in as many years the Crimson Tide lost 28–0. After a scoreless first quarter, TCU took a 14–0 halftime lead after they scored a pair short second-quarter touchdown runs by Buddy Dike and Marvin Lasater. The Frogs then closed the game with a 49-yard Dick Finney quarterback sneak for a touchdown in the third and on a short Jim Shofner touchdown run in the fourth to win 28–0. The loss brought Alabama's all-time record against TCU to 0–3.

Tennessee

Sources:

In their annual rivalry game against Tennessee, the score was tied at zero as the teams entered the fourth quarter. However, a pair of touchdowns by the Volunteers in the final quarter gave Tennessee the 14–0 victory in Birmingham. The Vols touchdowns were scored on a nine-yard Bobby Gordon touchdown pass to Tommy Potts and then on a four-yard Gordon run in the win. The loss brought Alabama's all-time record against Tennessee to 18–17–5.

Mississippi State

Sources:

One year after the Crimson Tide defeated Mississippi State to end their 17-game losing streak, the Maroons were victorious on homecoming at Denny Stadium by a final score of 25–13. Alabama took a 6–0 lead on the second play of the game when Jim Loftin scored on a 65-yard touchdown run. The lead was short lived as on the Maroons possession that ensued, Billy Stacy threw a 57-yard touchdown pass to Charles Weatherly that tied the game 6–6. State then took a 12–6 halftime lead on a 21-yard Gil Peterson touchdown run in the second quarter.

After a scoreless third quarter, the Maroons extended their lead to 25–6 in the fourth quarter on short touchdown runs by Molly Halbert and Robert Collins. The Crimson Tide then made the final score 25–13 on a 62-yard Bobby Jackson touchdown pass to Marlin Dyess late in the final period. The loss brought Alabama's all-time record against Mississippi State to 29–10–3.

Georgia

Sources:

Against the Georgia Bulldogs, Alabama won their first game of the season 14–13 at Sanford Stadium in Athens. The Bulldogs took a 6–0 first quarter lead after Theron Sapp scored on a one-yard touchstone run. The Crimson Tide responded with a pair of second-quarter touchdowns and took a 14–6 halftime lead. Both scores came on a pair of Bobby Smith touchdown passes, the first to Charles Gray from 46-yards and the second to Willie Beck from 16-yards out. Georgia was able to score a second touchdown in the third quarter on a six-yard Charles Britt pass to Donald Soberdash; however, the blocked extra point from their first score provided the final margin of defeat for the Bulldogs. The victory improved Alabama's all-time record against Georgia to 22–17–4.

Tulane

Sources:

In their annual home game played at Ladd Stadium, the Crimson Tide were shutout 7–0 by the Tulane Green Wave at Mobile. The only points of the game came on a four-yard Richie Petitbon touchdown run in the first quarter. The loss brought Alabama's all-time record against Tulane to 17–9–2.

Georgia Tech

Sources:

Against Georgia Tech, Alabama lost 10–7 to the Yellow Jackets at Legion Field. The Crimson Tide took a 7–0 first quarter lead after Danny Wilbanks scored on a one-yard touchdown run that capped an 80-yard drive. Alabama held the lead through the fourth quarter, but Tech scored ten points to win in the final period. Freddie Braselton tied the game 7–7 with his one-yard touchdown run and then Urban Henry scored the game-winning field goal late in the fourth that made the final score 10–7. The loss brought Alabama's all-time record against Georgia Tech to 18–18–3.

Mississippi Southern

Sources:

In their final non-conference game of the season, Alabama won their second game of the season against the Mississippi Southern Golden Eagles 29–2 at Denny Stadium. After a scoreless first quarter, Alabama took a 7–0 halftime lead on a one-yard Danny Wilbanks touchdown run in the second quarter. After Wilbanks scored his second touchdown in the third quarter, Southern gave up a safety on a bad snap on a punt attempt. On the free kick that ensued, Clay Walls returned it 66-yards for a touchdown and a 22–0 lead. After the Crimson Tide took a 29–0 lead in the fourth quarter on a 14-yard Bobby Skelton touchdown pass to Marlin Dyess before the Southerners ended the shutout attempt when Skelton was sacked for a safety. The victory improved Alabama's all-time record against Mississippi Southern to 7–2–1.

Auburn

Sources:

Against the rival Auburn, the Tigers scored 34 first half points en route to a 40–0 shutout victory at Legion Field in the season finale. After the Tigers recovered an Alabama fumble on their first possession, Auburn took a 7–0 lead on a one-yard Bill Atkins touchdown run. Atkins then extended their lead to 14–0 with a six-yard touchdown run later in the first that capped a six-play, 62-yard drive. Up by 14, three second-quarter touchdowns resulted in a 34–0 halftime lead for Auburn. Points were scored on a two-yard Lloyd Nix run and on interception returns of 21-yards by Tommy Lorino and 66-yards by Jackie Burkett.

The final Auburn touchdown was scored in the third on a 27-yard Nix pass to Jim Phillips that made the final score 40–0. The loss brought Alabama's all-time record against Auburn to 9–12–1. Three days after their victory over the Crimson Tide, Auburn was recognized as the 1957 national champions by the Associated Press in their final poll of the season.

After the season
In the week that followed their loss to Tennessee, the University of Alabama Faculty Committee on Physical Education and Athletics announced the University would not renew coach Whitworth's contract effective December 1 at the conclusion of the season. On December 3, the University formally introduced then Texas A&M head coach and former Crimson Tide player Bear Bryant as the new head coach of the Crimson Tide. At the time of the announcement, Bryant also became athletic director as the replacement for Hank Crisp and signed a ten-year contract to serve as Alabama's head coach.

Personnel

Varsity letter winners

Coaching staff

References
General

 

Specific

Alabama
Alabama Crimson Tide football seasons
Alabama Crimson Tide football